Major Alexander St. Clair Abrams (March 10, 1845- June 5, 1931) was an American attorney, politician, and writer. He was born in New Orleans in 1845 and moved to Florida in 1875. He fought in the Confederate Army beginning in 1861 and later wrote A full and detailed history of the siege of Vicksburg. In 1880, Abrams founded the city of Tavares, Florida. In 1887, he aided in the introduction of the bill which would establish Lake County, Florida. He died in Jacksonville, Florida on June 5, 1931.

References

1845 births
1931 deaths
Florida politicians
People from Tavares, Florida
Lake County, Florida
Confederate States Army officers
19th-century American historians